Sandsøya or Sandsøy may refer to:

Sandsøya, Møre og Romsdal, an island in Sande municipality in Møre og Romsdal county, Norway
Sandsøya, Nordland, an island in Vågan municipality in Nordland county, Norway
Sandsøya, Troms, an island in Harstad municipality in Troms county, Norway
Sandsøya, Vestland, an island in Tysnes municipality in Vestland county, Norway
Sandsøy Church, a church in Harstad municipality in Troms county, Norway